is a Japanese adult visual novel produced by Giga, originally released on March 31, 2006. The game was ported to the PlayStation 2 in 2007, the PlayStation Portable in 2009, and the PlayStation Vita in 2015 came with additional content although the adult content was removed. An anime television series was made in 2007 under the title .

Gameplay

Kono Aozora ni Yakusoku os gameplay requires minimal interaction on the player's part as much of the time that is spent on the game is for reading the text that is displayed at the bottom of the screen. The displayed text represents either the thoughts of the characters or the dialogue between the characters. As the story progresses, decision points will appear on the screen where the player can choose which heroine or heroines they wish to talk to. Depending on what choices the player makes, the plot will progress in a certain direction. There are six different routes in total. To view all six of these plot lines, the player will have to replay the game several times and make different choices in order to get the different endings.

The game is split into three, a prologue in the beginning and two other parts. The first part is split between two acts, spring and summer. Based on what a particular heroine feels for the protagonist, the game will proceed towards a heroine's particular route in the second part at the end of the summer.

Plot

Setting
Kono Aozora ni Yakusoku o takes place on a fictional island called  located slightly south of Honshū in Japan.

Character

 (anime)
The protagonist of the story. He is a childhood friend of Umi Hayama. He has a caring personality and is particularly conscientious about his fellow dorm residents. Every episode begins with him reminiscing about his days in the dormitory and reminiscing about his relationships with each of the girls as well as their pasts (in order Rinna, Miya, Shizu, Umi, Saeri and Naoko).
He used to live with his grandparents. During the early episodes, Wataru lied to them about living in the boys' dorm. He was the only boy who wanted to live in the dorm, therefore the boys' dorm was closed the previous year and all of the boarding students from Takamidzuka high school (including the males) now live in the girls' dorm. His grandparents eventually figure out that Wataru lied to them.

 (Windows/PSP), Kōrogi Satomi (anime/PS2)
A second year transfer student. Wataru Hoshino meets her at Takashi's bar while he's drunk. They chat and then leave. The next morning, Wataru wakes to find her asleep in his room wearing only bra and panties. When she wakes up, Wataru tells her he can't remember a thing from the night before, she slaps him and leaps from his second-story window.
She officially enters his school, joining his class and dorm the next day. She acts sullen and obstinate to both students and faculty. She skips the welcome party that the other dorm residents arranged for her, telling them that she doesn't want to make friends and face the pain of parting with them in only a year's time.  Wataru shouts to her his vow to that he will force her to become friends with them.
Takashi informs Wataru that he and Rinna first met in his bar. Realizing that Rinna's general aloofness stems from his having forgotten about her, he challenges her to compete with him in the upcoming school marathon to settle the matter. If he wins, she will participate in dorm meals, and if she wins, he will leave the dorm.
Wataru arrives at the marathon exhausted due to a surprise supplementary exam. He competes even though Rinna offers to postpone their competition. His exhaustion catches up to him and he takes a shortcut to cross the finish line first. Even though he is subsequently disqualified, Rinna welcomes the excuse to join the dorm residents in another welcome party.

 (Windows/PSP), Morisawa Fumi (anime/PS2)
A second year student just like Wataru. She is Wataru's childhood friend. She is good at cooking and cooks meals for evertone in the Tsugumi Dormitory. She has had a crush on Wataru ever since they were kids, but he is oblivious to it. 
When Umi was a child, she was very shy. She doesn't like to be alone and she always hung around with Wataru when they were little. She goes almost everywhere with Wataru. Some people dislike Umi and her father because her mother and Wataru's father had an intimate relationship a long time ago.

 (Windows/PSP), Orikasa Ai (anime/PS2)
A third years student who gets high grades and is the student council president. She seems to be a friendly and outgoing person when she is with teachers and students, but it's all put on. She enjoys teasing the boarders of Tsugumi dorm. She is like a big sister and is more reliable than Saeri.

 (Windows/PSP), Nakata Junko (anime/PS2)
A new student who is a granddaughter of previous chairman of the board of directors of Takamidzuka senior high school and owner of Tsugumi dorm. She is the acting chairman and the temporary owner the dorm. She was brought up in the care of the Rokujou family, who founded Demizugawa Heavy Industry, but her fate changed after she met Wataru at Tsugumi dorm last New Year's Day. She is clumsy in everything she does. Has a habit of counting her steps on the stairway to their dormitory.

 (Windows/PSP), Hitomi (anime/PS2)
A new student who is bashful in front of strangers. Her parents left her and she seldom showed her feelings when Wataru first met her. Saeri stood up for her and she began to live at Tsugumi dorm and she gradually began to show her feelings. She is quiet and small, but a good athlete.

 (Windows/PSP), Kaori Nazuka (anime/PS2)
A second year student who transferred a day earlier than Rinna. She talks quickly, has sunny disposition and is frank with her classmates. She often approaches Wataru, but he refuses to deal with her.

 (PSP)
A second year student who suddenly declares her love to Wataru. Although Wataru knows the names of almost everybody who lives on the island, he does not remember her name because she has a poor presence. She appears only in the PSP game.

 (Windows/PSP), MARIO (anime/PS2)
The homeroom teacher of class 2-A, she teaches Japanese language, is the dormitory manager and the student council adviser. She is called Sae-chan by her students. She competes with Naoko even though she is a student, because Naoko is more reliable than she is.

Story
The people of Minami-sakōjima Island, isolated far from Honshū Japan, were worrying over how to deal with depopulation. The key industry of this island is the aerospace industry owned by the Demizugawa Heavy Industry. Nevertheless, Demizugawa Heavy Industry decided to close down the factories and laboratories on Minami-sakōjima Island. Takamidsuka senior high school is the only high school on Minami-sakōjima Island. This school has a dormitory named "Tsugumi Dormitory", which was remodeled from a former schoolhouse.

There's  a collusive relationship between the principal of Takamidsuka senior high school and a resort development company "Rinchu Real-estate". Together they contrive to demolish the Tsugumi Dormitory and build a huge resort hotel on the lot. The principal hopes to tie into Rinchu Real-estate's interests. As a result, he decided to stand for the Mayoralty of Minami-sakōjima Town.

The principal declares that he will close down the Tsugumi Dormitory if the number of boarders falls below five. Currently there are five boarders in this dormitory: Umi, Naoko, Miyaho, Shizu and Wataru. Next spring, Naoko will enter a University far from the island. Umi, Rinna, Miyaho and Shizu (Their fathers are engineers in Demizugawa) will move from Minami-sakōjima Island as well. Therefore, Tsugumi Dormitory will be closed down and the boarders of Tsugumi Dormitory are destined to separate from each other. Together they spend community life as the last boarders of Tsugumi Dormitory.

A transfer student Rinna enters the Tsugumi Dormitory. She behaves disobediently in the school and the dormitory. She hates other boarders welcoming her. Wataru continues trying to welcome Rinna to the Tsugumi Dormitory. One day, Wataru noticed that Rinna is an excellent long-distance runner.

The series consists of 13 episodes with the first 12 centering on the background of each of the 6 female characters, with each one of them being the "title characters" of those episodes (in order: Rinna, Miya, Shizu, Umi, Saeri and Naoko) While the 13th episode centers on the characters preparing to leave their dormitory

Development
Kono Aozora ni Yakusoku o'''s scenarios were written by Fumiaki Maruto and Kikakuya. The art was provided by Nekonyan.

Release historyKono Aozora ni Yakusoku os limited edition was first released on March 31, 2006 while the regular edition followed on June 23, 2006. The limited edition came with a two-disc soundtrack while preorders of the game came with a special drama CD. The PlayStation 2 port, Kono Aozora ni Yakusoku o: Melody of the Sun and Sea, was released on May 31, 2007. The PlayStation 2 port included additions and corrections by Kikakuya to the scenarios, changes to the CG and game system, and new short stories that are introduced after a particular route has been cleared. The PlayStation Portable port, was released on June 25, 2009. The PlayStation Vita port is scheduled to be released on December 17, 2015.

The anime adaptation's opening theme, was also sung by Kaori and the ending theme, was sung by Ayumi Murata.

Theme songs (Game)
Opening Theme
"allegretto -Sora to Kimi-" by KOTOKO
Opening Theme 2 (PlayStation 2)
"Chiisana Brilliant" by KAORI
Opening Theme 2 (PlayStation Portable)
"Tsumasaki Movin'on" by Megu Sakuragawa
Ending Theme
"Sayonara no Kawari ni" by Tugumi Ryou Ryouseikai Gasshoudan
Insert Theme
"Pieces" by Miwa Oosaki
Insert Theme 2 (PlayStation 2)
"Taiyou to Umi no Melody" by Ayane
Insert Theme 2 (PlayStation Portable)
"Tenohira no Rakuen" by Annabel

Theme songs (Anime)
Opening Theme
"Kono Aozora ni Yakusoku o" by KAORI
Ending Theme
"Aozora no Fantasia" by Ayumi Murata
Insert Theme (episode 13)
"Sayonara no Kawari ni" by Tugumi Ryou Ryouseikai Gasshoudan

ReceptionKono Aozora ni Yakusoku o'' was awarded the Bishōjo Game Award gold prize in the scenario, theme song, romance, and user approval categories in addition to the grand prize in 2006. It was also voted the 12th most interesting galge in a survey of Dengeki G's Magazine readers in August 2007.

References

External links
Game official website 
Anime official website 
PlayStation 2 port official website 
PlayStation Portable port official website 

2006 video games
2007 Japanese television series endings
Anime television series based on video games
Artland (company)
Bishōjo games
Eroge
Harem anime and manga
Japan-exclusive video games
Manga based on video games
PlayStation 2 games
PlayStation Portable games
PlayStation Vita games
Romance video games
School life in anime and manga
Seinen manga
Video games developed in Japan
Visual novels
Windows games
Alchemist (company) games